David Klein (born 20 December 1993) is a Dutch chess grandmaster.

Chess career
Born in 1993, Klein earned his international master title in 2012 and his grandmaster title in 2014. He is the No. 19 ranked Dutch player as of March 2018.

References

External links

1993 births
Living people
Chess grandmasters
Dutch chess players
Sportspeople from Haarlem
20th-century Dutch people
21st-century Dutch people